The 2002 European Beach Volleyball Championships were held from August 29 to September 1, 2002 in Basel, Switzerland. It was the tenth official edition of the men's event, which started in 1993, while the women competed for the ninth time.

Men's competition
 A total number of 23 participating couples

Women's competition
 A total number of 24 participating couples

References
 Beach Volleyball Results

2002
E
B
B